Lakhan Lal Sahu is an Indian politician and a member of parliament to the 16th Lok Sabha from Bilaspur (Lok Sabha constituency), Chhattisgarh. He won the 2014 Indian general election being a Bharatiya Janata Party candidate.

References

India MPs 2014–2019
People from Bilaspur, Chhattisgarh
Living people
Lok Sabha members from Chhattisgarh
Bharatiya Janata Party politicians from Chhattisgarh
1971 births